Khin Khin Htwe (born 29 November 1962) is a retired Burmese athlete who competed in the middle-distance events. She represented her country at three consecutive Summer Olympics, starting in 1988, as well as two World Championships. In addition, she won multiple medals on regional level.

She still holds national records in the 1500 and 3000 metres.

Competition record

Personal bests
Outdoor

•10000metres-35:44.45(Philippines 

800 metres – 2:05.67 (Beijing 1990)
1500 metres – 4:12.21 (Tokyo 1991)
3000 metres – 9:04.56 (Hiroshima 1994)
5000 metres – 16:42.31 (Jakarta 1987)

References

All-Athletics profile

External links
 

1962 births
Living people
Burmese female middle-distance runners
Athletes (track and field) at the 1988 Summer Olympics
Athletes (track and field) at the 1992 Summer Olympics
Athletes (track and field) at the 1996 Summer Olympics
Athletes (track and field) at the 1990 Asian Games
Athletes (track and field) at the 1994 Asian Games
Olympic athletes of Myanmar
World Athletics Championships athletes for Myanmar
Asian Games medalists in athletics (track and field)
Asian Games bronze medalists for Myanmar
Southeast Asian Games medalists in athletics
Southeast Asian Games gold medalists for Myanmar
Southeast Asian Games bronze medalists for Myanmar
Medalists at the 1990 Asian Games
Medalists at the 1994 Asian Games
Competitors at the 1985 Southeast Asian Games
Competitors at the 1987 Southeast Asian Games
Competitors at the 1989 Southeast Asian Games